This is an alphabetical listing of songs recorded by singer-songwriter Mary J. Blige, sorted alphabetically and listing the year of each song's first official release and the album(s) and/or single(s) they were included on.

Mary J. Blige has 14 studio albums in her career so far, as well as a soundtrack album and several compilations containing songs not available on her studio albums.

Songs

Notes

References

Mary J. Blige
Lists of songs recorded by American artists